ITRA may refer to:
Irish Tag Rugby Association
 International Trail Running Association
 Institute of Teaching and Research in Ayurveda